is an action role-playing game developed by Namco Tales Studio and published by Namco Bandai Games for the Nintendo DS, which released in Japan in March 2010. The game is based on the Sgt. Frog franchise with gameplay elements adapted from the Tales series.

Gameplay

Out of battle, Keroro RPG has similar gameplay to other titles in the Tales series. The player visits various towns throughout the game, in which they can talk to various NPCs, buy items, and progress the story. The player also goes to dungeons, which contain various enemies, treasures, and puzzles. After battles, the player acquires gold to buy various things, and experience points, which goes toward leveling up the party. When traveling between towns and dungeons, the player travels through the field map, which sometime contains no enemies.

Unlike the other Keroro Games, Keroro RPG uses the "Linear Motion Battle System", or LMBS. Like previous Tales games, Keroro RPG uses 2D sprites with combat taking place on a single two-dimensional line, and is completely real-time, with the player controlling one person and the others being controlled by A.I. if another person isn't controlling them. Similar to Tales of Hearts, only three party members are on the battlefield. The player also has the option of calling in characters from previous Namco-Bandai games to use an attack.

Development
Keroro RPG: Kishi to Musha to Densetsu no Kaizoku was officially revealed in Famitsu as the mysterious K-Project by Namco-Bandai in 2009. It was revealed that Namco Tales Studio will do the gameplay mechanics just like the previous Tales series.

Reception

Famitsu staff said "basically it's Tales of Keroro," one reviewer wrote, "They took the charm of the [anime] series and built the Tales system around it, creating a very orthodox but still well-made game. The battles are a little tough, but the combos are fun enough that you don't mind trying as often as it takes. It's also nice how you can change the difficulty level at any time." On the negative side, "the menu controls are a little annoying, and the field map seems a tad unfinished [...] The battles are so well done that it's a shame the story is so obviously a series of fetch quests."

Notes

References

External links
 Official website  

2010 video games
Japan-exclusive video games
Nintendo DS games
Nintendo DS-only games
Role-playing video games
Tales (video game series) video games
Video games about amphibians
Video games based on anime and manga
Video games developed in Japan